Storyteller is the debut album from Canadian R&B singer Raghav. Combining elements of his South-Asian background with reggae and US style R&B, Raghav has defined his own style as showcased in the UK top ten hits with "Can't Get Enough", "So Confused" and "Angel Eyes". The album reached No. 36 on the UK Albums Chart.

Track listing

References

2004 debut albums
Raghav albums
V2 Records albums